Pojo  may refer to:
 Pojo, Cochabamba, a village in Bolivia
 Pojo Municipality, Bolivia, whose seat is Pojo
 Pohja, a Finnish bilingual former municipality, called Pojo in Swedish
 POJO, abbreviation of plain old Java object in computer programming
 Poughkeepsie Journal
 A secret character in the 1996 arcade game and its 1997 N64 port Mace: The Dark Age, so called because of its chicken-like appearance and the on Spanish pollo
 A secret character/object with a chicken-like appearance in the video game Gauntlet Dark Legacy, which was created by the same company as the above-mentioned Mace: The Dark Age